The men's 3000 metres steeplechase event at the 1955 Pan American Games was held at the Estadio Universitario in Mexico City on 18 March.

Results

References

Athletics at the 1955 Pan American Games
1955